Nurhalimah (born 14 August 1997) is an Indonesian footballer who plays a goalkeeper for Asprov Jabar and the Indonesia women's national team.

Club career
Nurhalimah has played for Asprov Jawa Barat in Indonesia.

International career 
Nurhalimah represented Indonesia at the 2022 AFC Women's Asian Cup.

Honours

Club
Persib Putri
 Liga 1 Putri: 2019

References

External links

1997 births
Living people
People from Bogor
Sportspeople from West Java
Indonesian women's footballers
Women's association football goalkeepers
Indonesia women's international footballers